Yaman Ayşem(tr) is a Turkish and Greek folkloric tune (Karsilamas).The meter is .

Original form
The original form of the karsilamas was popular in Laconia.

See also
Karsilamas
Aise
Aydın Karşılaması

References

Turkish songs
Greek songs
Year of song unknown
Songwriter unknown